Mario Perrone (born 6 February 2003) is an Italian footballer who plays as a defender for  club Avellino.

Career
Perrone made his Serie A debut for Salernitana on 15 January 2022 in a game against Lazio.

On 31 January 2023, Perrone signed with Avellino in Serie C.

References

External links
 

2003 births
People from Caserta
Sportspeople from the Province of Caserta
Footballers from Campania
Living people
Italian footballers
Association football defenders
U.S. Salernitana 1919 players
U.S. Avellino 1912 players
Serie A players